The Sky Classic Stakes is a Grade II Thoroughbred horse race run annually at Woodbine Racetrack in Toronto, Ontario, Canada. Raced in mid to late August on turf over a distance of  miles (10 furlongs), it is open to horses three years of age and older. In recent years it has become a major prep race for local horses looking to go on to run against the best horses from around the world in Woodbine's $2 million Canadian International.

Renamed in 1995 to honour Canadian Horse Racing Hall of Fame inductee, Sky Classic, the race was first run at the Old Woodbine Racetrack in 1902 as the Jockey Club Cup Handicap. It was raced on dirt from inception until 1956 but became a turf race the following year when moved to the new Woodbine racing facility. Over the years, it has been run at various distances:

On dirt:
1902–1903 : 2 miles
1904–1905 :  miles
1906–1926 :  miles
1927–1931 :  miles
1936–1951 :  miles
1952–1956 :  miles

On turf:
1957–1989 :  miles
1990–1994 :  miles
1995 : 1 mile
1996 :  miles
1997–2009 :  miles
2010–2016 :  miles
2017–present :  miles

Records
Time record: 
 2:00.12 - Forte Dei Marmi (2013) (at  miles on turf)
 2:13.05 - Dawson's Legacy (1999) (at  miles on turf)

Most wins:
 2 - Sotemia (1911, 1912)
 2 - Harrovian (1924, 1925)
 2 - Carney's Point (1974, 1975)
 2 - Chief Bearhart (1997, 1998)
 2 - Forte Dei Marmi (GB) (2012, 2013)

Most wins by an owner:
 5 - Sam-Son Farm (1991, 1997, 1998, 2002, 2004)

Most wins by a jockey:
 4 - Robin Platts (1974, 1975, 1980, 1981)

Most wins by a trainer:
 4 - Lou Cavalaris, Jr. (1966, 1974, 1975, 1990)

Winners of the Sky Classic Stakes since 1969

*Run in two divisions in 1994.

Earlier winners 

 1968 - Petit Duc
 1967 - Pretko
 1966 - Orbiter
 1965 - Quick Pitch
 1964 - Greek Form
 1963 - Mr. Sometime *
 1963 - Bronze Babu *
 1962 - El Bandito
 1961 - Prompt Hero
 1960 - Merry Top II
 1959 - Sailor's Guide
 1958 - Grey Monarch
 1957 - Kitty Girl
 1956 - Ballydonnell
 1955 - Hickory Hill
 1954 - Unbranded
 1953 - Risque Rouge
 1952 - Freedom Wins
 1951 - Harahome
 1950 - Beau Dandy
 1949 - Double Briar
 1948 - Yellowknife
 1947 - Vice Admiral
 1946 - Ferry Pilot
 1945 - Westport Point
 1944 - Bon Jour
 1943 - Teeworth
 1941 - No race
 1942 - No race
 1940 - High Honors
 1939 - Filisteo
 1938 - Sun Power
 1937 - Teddy Haslam
 1936 - Temptestuous
 1932 - No race
 1933 - No race
 1934 - No race
 1935 - No race
 1931 - Khorasan
 1930 - Yarn
 1929 - Frisius
 1928 - Sir Harry
 1927 - Display
 1926 - Harrovian
 1925 - Harrovian
 1924 - Horologe
 1923 - My Dear
 1922 - Parisian Diamond
 1921 - Louis
 1920 - Exterminator
 1917 - No race
 1918 - No race
 1919 - No race
 1916 - Fair Mac
 1915 - Rancher
 1914 - Great Britain
 1913 - Airey
 1912 - Sotemia
 1911 - Sotemia
 1910 - Duke of Roanoke
 1909 - Azo
 1908 - Cave Adsum
 1907 - Kelpie
 1906 - Alma Dufour
 1905 - War Whoop
 1904 - Persistence II
 1903 - Wire In
 1902 - Orontas

*In 1963 there was a dead heat for first.

See also
 List of Canadian flat horse races

References

 Jockey Club Cup Handicap at Pedigree Queery

Graded stakes races in Canada
Turf races in Canada
Open middle distance horse races
Woodbine Racetrack
Recurring events established in 1902